Stressed Eric is a British animated sitcom that was produced by Absolutely Productions for the BBC Two television channel in the United Kingdom and Television New Zealand. The series revolves around Eric Feeble, a middle class man who is always stressed because of his family, work, co-workers, etc. The show ran for 2 series in the UK, while its redubbed American version only received one series. It was heavily panned by critics and audiences for its writing, humor, characters, voice acting and its overall concept of having a well-meaning and likable main character constantly be beaten and abused by everyone around him often without any apparent reason, but was praised for its animation.

Overview
40-year-old Eric Feeble is still upset over his divorce two years before. He lives in a middle-class London house and is always kept under extreme amounts of pressure and stress from all aspects of life, which is represented by a throbbing vein in his temple. His two children, Brian and Claire, plague him with fear and worry daily. Claire is a frail 6-year-old who is allergic to virtually everything, including wheat, ponies, and spices; 10-year-old Brian has learning problems and has been kept back three straight years in school, and has an oral fixation and pica. The family's au pair housekeeper, Maria, is an 18-year-old Portuguese woman with a serious drinking problem; despite Eric's frequent attempts to keep her under control and focused, she stays passed-out drunk for hours at a time. His former wife Liz left him for a Buddhist but phones him up incessantly, which merely adds to his stress level. The next-door neighbours, the wealthy, successful, snobbish Perfect family, provide him a constant and painful view of what his life could have been.

Eric's workplace is absolutely no escape from his everyday problems. His boss, Paul Power (known as PP), is loud, rude and demanding; he has demoted Eric from Assistant Manager to a low-level clerk in an office sandwiched between the janitor's closet and the men's toilets. His secretary Alison is completely useless, spending all her "working hours" in personal phone calls and shrilling rudely at Eric when he requests her attention.

At the end of almost every episode, as the climax of events cause Eric's stress to reach breaking point, the throbbing vein emerges from his temple and wraps itself around his neck, strangling and apparently killing him.

Characters

Main 
Eric Feeble (Mark Heap) – Stressed out divorced father of two children. Eric is a kind, well-meaning man who loves his children. Although bitter and sarcastic about many aspects of his life, Eric genuinely tries to make the best out of situation and deeply loves his children, going to great lengths to make them proud. However, he normally fails due to no fault of his own, and the rare times he actually does well, something always happens to ruin it.
Claire Feeble (Morwenna Banks) – Daughter of Eric; allergic to just about everything, but an intelligent, curious, playful little girl. Her allergies require her to eat special regulation food, but she is always sneaking ordinary food which immediately swells her up.
Brian Feeble (Gábor Csupó) – Son of Eric; has been held back in school for 3 years straight. He has pica and as a result, is always putting strange things in his mouth.
Maria Gonzalez (Doon Mackichan) – The Feeble family's punk-looking live-in au pair; she is Portuguese and always drunk or hungover.

The broadcast of the series on NBC in the United States replaced Mark Heap's voice with that of Hank Azaria, whom also serves as a producer for the dub, repurposing Eric as an American expatriate.

Supporting
Liz (Rebecca Front) – Eric's eccentric former wife.
Caleb (Bill Nighy) – Liz's boyfriend.
Ray Perfect (Alexander Armstrong) – Snobbish and "perfect" next-door neighbour of Eric. Shares Eric's workplace, but is senior and consistently praised for his fine work.
Sue Perfect (Alison Steadman) – Snobbish wife of Mr. Perfect. Catchphrase: "How art thou, Eric?"
Heather Perfect (Morwenna Banks) – Snobbish daughter of Mr. and Mrs. Perfect.
Paul Power, a.k.a. P.P. (Geoffrey McGivern) – Boss of Eric who is usually very angry. Catchphrase: "Double arseburgers, Eric!"
Alison Scabie (Doon Mackichan) – Eric's useless secretary who spends all her time on the telephone gossiping to friends.
Doc (Paul Shearer) – Eric's dementedly relaxed doctor, more interested in chasing women than treating Eric. He is the closest thing Eric has to a best friend.
Mrs. Wilson (Hayley Mills) – An old lady who slowly tries in vain to post a letter which always falls from her hand and into a drain, sometimes with Eric to blame. Catchphrase: "Morning, Mister Eric. Just off to the post..."
Gordon Kennedy voices various characters.

Episodes

Series 1 (1998) 
This is the only series to broadcast in the United States.

Series 2 (2000)

Broadcast and production
The show was first broadcast on BBC2 in April 1998 and ran for two series. Stressed Eric was bought and briefly aired by NBC and adapted for American audiences with the lead character's voice redubbed and re-worked as an American expatriate with several original lines changed for cultural purposes, a new opening sequence that reflects the changed storyline and cutting scenes for time constraints.

Stressed Eric continued when Hibbert Ralph produced the second series. The second series was animated by Varga Studio instead.

Reception
Stressed Eric was met with mostly negative reviews from critics and audiences; both the Britain version and the U.S. version. The show's criticism's not only come from Hank Azaria's performance in the American version for being out of place and off-synch, it also came from the overall concept of the title character constantly getting tortured for no reason. The show was criticized for its writing, characters, humor, and voice acting.

In a positive view, Variety noted that the lead character "is so unfathomably pathetic that he makes Homer Simpson look like Bill Gates" and was critical of the decision to redub the series in American English for the first series, but stated that the series was otherwise "wry and smart".

Charles Solomon of the Los Angeles Times said that the series "seems to be trying to out-do South Park for sheer tastelessness in an animated series" and that Azaria "may be able to make Eric likable, but it's going to be an uphill battle" since "the characters on Stressed Eric [...] come across as alienated, crass and nasty".

Tom Shales of The Washington Post expressed his surprise at the fact that the cartoon originally ran on the BBC—a broadcaster he felt "a history of great TV"—since "the British cartoon seems mainly an imitation of American cartoon hits like Fox's The Simpsons and King of the Hill, instead of the kind of thing the British do best". He also had a low opinion of the title character, calling him "an imbecilic stumblebum who appears to deserve the bad things that happen to him" and negatively comparing him to Homer Simpson.

Alan Pergament of the Buffalo News gave the programme a two-star rating. He hoped that "Azaria's narration will be a little slower than that of the British voice performer" but remarked that "Eric is such a bumbler and his life is so stressful that it isn't much fun to watch". He also thought the comparison to South Park in the series' promos was foolish, noted that it ran against another Americanized version of a British series—Whose Line Is It Anyway?—and remarked that "as good as it is to get some original programming in the summer, Stressed Eric is so routine that it's difficult to understand why it has won awards across the ocean."

DVD release
The Complete Stressed Eric Collection was released on DVD in the UK on 2 May 2011, with the following special features:

 The Story of Stressed Eric
 Drawing the Characters with Stig Bergqvist
 Audio Commentaries
 Animatic of Nativity Episode
 BBC Trails
 Storyboard Excerpt from Pony Episode

References

External links

 Official Absolutely Productions Site
 
 

1990s British adult animated television series
2000s British adult animated television series
1990s British black comedy television series
2000s British black comedy television series
1998 British television series debuts
2000 British television series endings
British adult animated comedy television series
English-language television shows
BBC Television shows
NBC original programming
Television series by Klasky Csupo
Animated television series about dysfunctional families
Television shows set in London